Sim Bong-geun (born October 3, 1943 in Goseong) is an archaeologist, university professor and administrator at Dong-A University in Greater Busan, South Korea. Sim was appointed as the 12th president of Dong-A University in 2007.

Sim received his bachelor's and master's degrees at Dong-A University and earned his PhD from Kyushu University in Fukuoka, Japan.

Sim started his archaeological career at the Dong-A University Museum, and was the museum's longtime Director. Upon earning a PhD, Sim joined the faculty of the Department of Archaeology and Art History at Dong-A University. In the 1990s Sim became the department head, and was named the Dean of the Graduate School in 1999. Sim was the vice-president at Dong-A University from 2000–2007.

See also
Kim Won-yong
Kim Jung-bae
Prehistory of Korea

Selected bibliography
 Han-il Jiseokmyo-ui Gwangye [The Relationship between Korean and Japanese Dolmens]. Hanguk Kogo Hakbo [Journal of the Korean Archaeological Society] 10–11, 1981.
 Hanguk Cheongdonggi Sidae Munhwa-ui Ihae [Understanding the Bronze Age of Korea]. Dong-A Daehakgyo Chulpanbu, Greater Busan, 1990.
 Hanguk-eso Bon Ilbon Yayoi Munhwa-ui Jeongae [The Spread of Yayoi Culture as Seen from Korea]. Hakyeon Munhwasa, Seoul, 1999.

References
Brief bibliography of Sim Bong-geun

1943 births
Living people
South Korean archaeologists
South Korean expatriates in Japan
Asian archaeology
Kyushu University alumni
Cheongsong Sim clan
Academic staff of Dong-a University